The Montana–Montana State football rivalry is an annual college football rivalry game between the University of Montana Grizzlies and the Montana State University Bobcats. The game is most historically and commonly known as the Cat-Griz game, and sometimes as the Griz-Cat game. Since 1997, the match has been advertised as the Brawl of the Wild. The winner receives the massive Great Divide Trophy, as the universities are on opposite sides of the continental divide.

The rivalry began in 1897, making it the 31st-oldest in NCAA Division I and the eleventh-oldest west of the Mississippi River.  It is also the fourth-oldest Football Championship Subdivision rivalry. Since 1993, the match-up has been the final game of the season for both teams, and has often had implications for the Big Sky Conference championship and its automatic bid to the NCAA Division I Football Championship playoffs. Previously, it was usually played in late October or early November.

, the game has been played 121 times. Montana officially leads the all-time series , with one Montana victory (2011) having been vacated by the National Collegiate Athletic Association (NCAA).

History
The series has three distinct periods. From 1897 to 1916, Montana State did not belong to a conference, while Montana was in the Northwest Intercollegiate Athletic Association. In addition to Montana, the Northwest Conference included Washington, Washington State, Oregon, Oregon State, Idaho, and Whitman College. At times, the two teams would play twice per year. Early seasons had seven games or less, and one season the teams played just one game. Four of the five ties in the series came during this era. Montana won twelve games to Montana State's seven.

Montana State joined the Rocky Mountain Athletic Conference (RMAC) in 1917, and Montana joined the Pacific Coast Conference (today's Pac-12 Conference) in 1924. The RMAC included several teams that later became Mountain West Conference members. When MSU joined the RMAC, it included Colorado, Colorado State, Utah, Utah State, and Brigham Young. When UM joined the PCC, it included Stanford, California, UCLA, USC, Oregon, Oregon State, Washington, Washington State, and Idaho. The Bobcats were a member of the RMAC, which moved into the NAIA, in 1938 and remained a member through 1956.  The Grizzlies were a member of the PCC through the 1949 season before joining the Skyline (a.k.a., Mountain States) Conference, which included Colorado, Utah State, Denver, Utah, Colorado State, Brigham Young, New Mexico and Wyoming from 1951 to 1961. MSU was independent from 1957 to 1962 and UM was independent in 1950 and 1962. During this period UM enjoyed a  edge in Cat-Griz games, while MSU shared the NAIA national title in 1956.

Both schools entered the Big Sky Conference as charter members in 1963, with Montana then holding a 43–15–5 series lead. Prior to that, UM was in conferences with what are now FBS and Power 5 conference schools, while MSU was either not in a conference or in a NAIA conference, for 49 of the 59 games played.  UM holds a 37–7–5 advantage in those games. In games that the schools were in the same or similar classifications, Montana holds a 36–34–0 edge.

In the first 23 years of the Big Sky Conference, Montana State enjoyed its most successful period in the Cat-Griz rivalry with a 17–6 win–loss record and two national titles, one Division II and one Division I-AA. A new period began in 1986, often known in Montana as "The Streak," in which Montana won sixteen straight games in the series. A few of these games were close, but most of them gave a strong indication that the two football programs were going in very different directions. Montana won two NCAA Division I-AA championships during "The Streak," while Montana State had one season where it failed to win a single game.

On November 19, 2022, ESPN's College GameDay broadcast live from Dyche Field on the campus of Montana State in Bozeman on the morning prior to the 121st edition of the rivalry.

Great Divide Trophy

The Great Divide Trophy was created in 2001 by Dave Samuelson, and was made possible by numerous donations. The winner of each game possesses the trophy for one year. The school with the most wins during the trophy period will take permanent possession of the trophy at the end of the 21st century.

Montana was the first to receive the trophy following their victory in 2001. Since then, the trophy has since changed hands nine times. Montana State won the 2022 game and has won five of the last six games. , the trophy series is tied at 10–10.

The Great Divide Trophy trophy weighs  and is one of the heaviest college football trophies.

Notable games

1968 

In 1968, quarterback Dennis Erickson, flanker Ron Bain, and running back Paul Schafer lead a monumental comeback as the Bobcats clinched a tie for the Big Sky championship—their third straight. Trailing 24–9 in the fourth quarter, Montana State scored twenty points in the last nine minutes and won 29–24 when Schafer, who had 58 carries for 234 yards in the game, dove into the end zone with twelve seconds left. The Grizzlies appeared to have the drive stopped at the MSU 32, but a facemask penalty gave the Cats new life on the 17.

In all, 34 points were scored in the final quarter. Bain's brother, Doug of the Grizzlies, gave Montana a 17–9 lead early in the quarter on a pass from Ray Brum. After another UM touchdown made the score 24–9 with just over 10 minutes to go, it looked as if the Grizzlies would win going away, but the Bobcats rallied. Schaefer scored on a short run with 8:15 to play and Erickson hit Bain for a touchdown with five minutes left cutting the lead to two at 24–22.

After Schafer's touchdown, the Grizzlies nearly spoiled things for MSU. UM took over at the 20.  Speedy receiver Ron Baines gained 15 yards, on top of which another 15 were tacked on for an unnecessary roughness penalty.  Baines then made a circus run of 37 yards from midfield before he was dragged down at the MSU 13 by MSU defensive back Terry Brown as time expired.

1997 

In another exciting finish in the series, Montana State fought back from a 21–7 halftime deficit only to lose 27–25 on an improbable last-second field goal by Kris Heppner. Just as the first half ended, MSU was whistled for having too many men on the field, which gave Montana one extra play.  The Grizzlies made the Bobcats pay for this mistake by scoring a touchdown on a long TD pass by Brian Ah Yat to end the half.  Behind the passing of Rob Compson MSU methodically worked its way back into the game and took a 25–24 lead on a three-yard run by Eric Kinnamon with 22 seconds to play in Bobcat Stadium. The Bobcats appeared poised to snap an 11-game losing streak to the Grizzlies, but Montana wasn't done.

Thanks to a kickoff that sailed out of bounds, Montana got the ball on its own 35-yard line with no time expended from the clock. After an incomplete pass, UM quarterback Brian Ah Yat found receiver Justin Olsen for a completion of 46 yards to the MSU 19 with eight seconds to play. Ah Yat recovered his own muffed snap on the next play.  After a UM timeout, Kris Heppner kicked a 38-yard field goal as time expired, giving Montana the 27–25 win.

The Bobcats also misfired on special teams all game.  Prior to kicking the ball out of bounds, they failed on three extra point attempts, which would've given them a 28–24 lead on Kinnamon's touchdown and forced UM to score a touchdown instead of a field goal on its final drive.

1998 

Montana State would get its heart broken again a year later. Leading in this game 21–20, and ahead for most of the second half, the Bobcats fell when Dallas Neil took a pass from Brian Ah Yat and tightroped the sideline for an 18-yard touchdown with just over five minutes to play. UM converted the two-point attempt and the Grizzlies won 28–21.

The game was played at a slippery Washington-Grizzly Stadium in Missoula, and extended the UM winning streak to 13 over MSU.

2002 

The Bobcats would finally put an end to their losing streak against the Griz at 16 games when true freshman quarterback Travis Lulay led them to a 10–7 win in Missoula on a snowy, windy day.  Lulay connected with Junior Adams for a 53-yard touchdown in the third quarter, and after a fumble led to Montana's lone score of the day, MSU's defense made the 10–7 score hold up.

The Bobcats held UM quarterback John Edwards to just 8-for-32 and 106 yards passing on the day. Edwards completed just one pass in the first half. MSU was led by senior running back Ryan Johnson, who ran for 132 yards, and cornerback Joey Thomas, who blocked a field goal and played a big role in Edwards' struggles.

2010 

The Grizzlies needed a win in their final regular season game to continue its string of 12 straight conference championships and 17 straight playoff appearances.  The Bobcats needed a win to clinch the conference title and a seed in the playoffs. With the game being played in Missoula, the Grizzlies appeared to have the advantage, but MSU scored touchdowns on its first three possessions and made them hold up for a 21–16 win with clutch defensive play in the second half.

UM advanced the ball inside the MSU 10-yard line twice in the second half, but the Bobcats forced fumbles on both possessions, including one by star running back Chase Reynolds. UM drove to the MSU 14 for a first and 10 with under two minutes to play, but MSU defensive end Dustin O'Connell came through for the Bobcats. O'Connell (who had just returned from a severely broken collarbone) and linebacker Jody Owens dropped Reynolds for a one-yard loss on first down.  O'Connell then hurried UM quarterback Justin Roper into throwing an incomplete pass on second down, and batted down a pass intended for a wide-open Kavario Middleton on third down. Roper threw the ball out of bounds on fourth down. UM would get one more chance to score when it moved the ball to the MSU 34, but the Bobcats sealed the win with an interception on the goal line by senior captain Michael Rider on the last play of the game.

2011 

Montana State entered the 111th clash as the No. 1 ranked team in the nation for the first time since 1985.  The Grizzlies put an end to that in humiliating fashion with a 36–10 win in front of the largest crowd (20,247) to attend a Cat-Griz game in Bozeman.

A safety by UM cornerback Trumaine Johnson helped set up a short TD pass on a fourth-down pass late in the first half to give UM a 12–0 lead. After Montana State scored quickly to start the second half, the Grizzlies answered on the next play with a 79-yard bomb from Jordan Johnson to Jabin Sambrano.  UM cruised from there. Montana finished the game with 309 yards rushing.

2012 

Montana hadn't had a losing season since 1986, the year it moved into Washington-Grizzly Stadium, but that would all change as the Bobcats won 16–7 to take their second straight win and third in six tries in what is arguably the toughest road venue in the FCS. The loss left the Grizzlies with a 5–6 overall mark and a 3–5 conference mark. They finished the year 3–3 at home, the first time they failed to finish above .500 at home.

After a first-quarter touchdown gave UM a 7–3 lead, MSU didn't allow another point and only gave up 192 yards in holding Montana to one of its lowest scoring outputs in stadium history. Kruiz Siewing, from tiny Saco, Montana, scored MSU's only TD on a pass from DeNarius McGhee, and Rory Perez kicked three field goals, including the game-clincher with 2:32 to play.

2016 

Montana State, which came into the game with a 3–7 record, went into Missoula and rushed for the most yards (368) by an opponent in Washington-Grizzly Stadium history, as it knocked off Montana, 24–17. The loss eliminated the Grizzlies from the FCS playoffs, by virtue of the Griz's 6–5 season record. It marked the first time that both teams missed the playoffs since 1992.

The Bobcats found themselves in a 7–0 hole after the first offensive play of the game by UM, as Brady Gustafson hit Justin Calhoun from 58 yards. MSU would allow just one first down the rest of the half, however, and true freshman quarterback Chris Murray scored from eight yards away when he flipped into the end zone on a running play, and again from 48 yards out when he out-raced UM's defenders to give the Bobcats a 14–7 halftime lead. A pair of long runs by Gunnar Brekke (65 yards) and Nick LaSane (61 yards) set up a field goal, and touchdown as MSU stretched its lead to 24–7.

The Grizzlies mounted a comeback with 10 straight points, but surrendered the ball on downs at the MSU 29 with 6:20 to play. The Bobcats, who had gone 3-and-out on their previous two series, were able to drain the clock on the ensuing possession. Murray ran for two first downs, then completed a 26-yard pass to Connor Sullivan on fourth-and-1 to seal the win.

Murray completed just two passes in the game, but rushed for 142 yards to become the third MSU freshman quarterback to start and win a Cat-Griz game at Washington-Grizzly Stadium.  He joined Travis Lulay and DeNarius McGhee, who accomplished the feat in 2002 and 2010, respectively.

2018 

The greatest comeback in Cat-Griz history occurred in 2018 at Washington-Grizzly Stadium in Missoula when Montana State rallied from a 22–0 deficit to a 29–25 win when it forced and recovered a fumble after Montana advanced the ball to within one-foot of the goal line with 14 seconds to play. The play was made possible when MSU coach Jeff Choate called a timeout just before the Grizzlies ran a play from the same spot that appeared to give them the go-ahead score.

To add to the drama, both teams entered the day with 6–4 records with the winner earning an at-large spot in the Football Championship Subdivision playoffs. The Bobcats came into the game having won the past two games with both wins knocking the Grizzlies out of contention for an at-large playoff spot.

Choate called the timeout to get a look at the formation UM was going to set up. The timeout call was met with boos from the large Grizzly crowd who felt the GRIZ had already hiked the ball and a touchdown scored . When the Bobcats re-took the field UM was in the essentially the same formation. Two MSU interior linemen, Tucker Yates and Chase Benson knocked the interior linemen for UM on their heels and middle linebacker Grant Collins dove into UM running back Adam Eastwood. Yates jarred the ball loose from Eastwood and Collins knocked it to the ground where defensive end Derek Marks recovered the ball to send the MSU bench into a frenzy.

UM scored on its first drive and the Grizzly' defense held MSU to just 50 yards until late in the second quarter, while tacking on two more scores behind the strong passing of quarterback Dalton Sneed to take a 22–0 lead.  MSU would get on the board in the final minute of the first half to cut the lead to 22–7, which was a boon for the Bobcats who were set to receive the opening kickoff of the second half.

The Bobcats couldn't do much with the momentum, however, and the two teams trade punts for most of the third quarter before the Bobcats drove inside the Grizzly 10 as the fourth quarter started. MSU quarterback Troy Andersen, who scored the Bobcats' first touchdown, scored again and also ran in a two-point conversion to cap off an 88-yard drive and whittle the lead down to 22–15.  It was the first of three straight scoring drives for MSU.

After a UM field goal made it 25–15, the Bobcats marched 75 yards and once again got a TD run by Andersen to draw within three points at 25–22.  On UM's next possession Collins forced and recovered a Sneed fumble to set up the Bobcats in Montana territory. Facing a first-and-20 on the UM 21 the Bobcats got an eight-yard run by Andersen and a 13-yard TD run by Logan Jones to take the lead with just over two minutes to play.

The Grizzlies would take the kickoff back to the 50-yard line and then worked the ball inside the one-yard line before MSU thwarted them.  The win also earned the Bobcats a berth in the FCS playoffs and marked the third straight win in the rivalry. The win matched the 1968 game for biggest fourth quarter comebacks as MSU trailed by 15 points in both games. Sneed finished with 354 yards passing and two touchdown passes in the loss. Two UM receivers Samuel Akem (147) and Keenan Curran (111) had over 100 yards receiving.  Andersen ran for 107 yards and three TDs, while Travis Jonsen had 101 yards receiving for MSU and Bobcat' punter Jared Padmos had three punts downed inside the five-yard line.

Accomplishments by the two rivals

Game results

Coaching records
Since 1946

Montana

Montana State

 Last tie was in 1928 and the Big Sky enacted overtime for conference games in 1980;all Division I games went to overtime in 1996 (none in this series through 2022).

See also
 List of NCAA college football rivalry games
 List of most played college football rivalries in NCAA Division I

Notes

References

College football rivalries in the United States
Montana Grizzlies football
Montana State Bobcats football
Big Sky Conference rivalries
1897 establishments in Montana